Ferrocarril de Langreo or FC de Langreo (FCL) was a Spanish railway company which operated a  line, in the Autonomous Community of Asturias, in northern Spain. It was the third train line constructed in Spain and was built during the 1850s.

History
The private  railway focused on moving coal and iron ore from the mines of Laviana and Langreo and the factory of La Felguera to Gijon.  It was the only non-urban Spanish railway built to near-standard gauge, which often led it to look for second-hand rolling stock, mainly from the United States. This included the purchase of:
Five USATC S160 Class steam locomotives in 1959 from the Alaska Railroad ARR 401 402 404 405 406 which kept their former numbers 
Talgo passenger coach sets built for the New York, New Haven and Hartford Railroad in 1964, the rolling stock of the John Quincy Adams (train).
Four ALCO RS-3 diesel electric units in 1964, from the Terminal Railroad Association of St. Louis. A fifth unit, numbered 1604, was purchased in 1971 from the Burlington Northern Railroad, a piece of surplus Great Northern Railway stock from the 1970 merger that formed the Burlington Northern.

In 1973, the FC de Langreo was absorbed by FEVE, which rebuilt the Gijon-Laviana line to  metre gauge in 1983.

See also 
FEVE
History of rail transport in Spain
RENFE
Transportation in Spain

References

External links
Steam locomotives of the FC de Lagreo
 The Railfaneurope.net Picture Gallery

Railway companies of Spain
Transport in Asturias
Metre gauge railways in Spain
Langreo